Nate Hobbs (born June 24, 1999) is an American football cornerback for the Las Vegas Raiders of the National Football League (NFL). He played college football at the University of Illinois Urbana-Champaign  and was drafted by the Raiders in the fifth round of the 2021 NFL Draft.

College career
Hobbs was ranked as a threestar recruit by 247Sports.com coming out of high school. He committed to Illinois on December 23, 2016 over offers from Ball State, Eastern Kentucky, Eastern Michigan, Ohio, Southeast Missouri State, Tennessee Tech, UT Martin, and Western Kentucky.

Professional career

Hobbs was drafted by the Las Vegas Raiders with the 167th pick in the fifth round of the 2021 NFL Draft on May 1, 2021. The Raiders obtained the 167th pick as a result of trading guard Gabe Jackson to the Seattle Seahawks. On May 17, Hobbs signed his four-year rookie contract with Las Vegas.

Hobbs entered the 2022 season as a starting cornerback. He suffered a broken hand in Week 5 and was placed on injured reserve on October 17, 2022. He was activated on December 3.

Personal life
On the morning of January 3, 2022, Hobbs was arrested for driving under the influence. He was found by the police asleep at the wheel of his car on a parking lot exit ramp.

References

External links
Illinois bio

1999 births
Living people
Players of American football from Louisville, Kentucky
American football cornerbacks
Illinois Fighting Illini football players
Las Vegas Raiders players